Hibbertia fruticosa is a species of flowering plant in the family Dilleniaceae and is endemic to New South Wales. It is a woody shrub with linear to lance-shaped leaves and yellow flowers arranged singly on the ends of short side shoots, with eighteen to thirty-five stamens arranged around three carpels.

Description
There are eighteen to thirty-five stamens arranged around the three hairy carpels, each carpel with four to six ovules.

Taxonomy
Hibbertia fruticosa was first formally described in 2013 by Hellmut R. Toelken in the Journal of the Adelaide Botanic Gardens from specimens collected by Ruurd Dirk Hoogland on the Mount Kaputar Road in 1972. The specific epithet (fruticosa) means "woody".

In the same journal, Toelken described two subspecies and the names are accepted by the Australian Plant Census:
 Hibbertia fruticosa Toelken subsp. fruticosa has distinctly pointed leaves and flowers in October and November;
 Hibbertia fruticosa subsp. pilligaensis Toelken lacks a distinct point on the end of the leaves and flowers from October to December.

Distribution and habitat
This hibbertia grows on rocky slopes in woodland. Subspecies fruticosa occurs in the northern park of the Nandewar Range and subspecies pilligaensis occurs on the North West Slopes of central New South Wales, including in the Pilliga Nature Reserve.

See also
List of Hibbertia species

References

fruticosa
Flora of New South Wales
Plants described in 2013
Taxa named by Hellmut R. Toelken